Ho Kang (born 8 April 1975) is a North Korean figure skater. He competed in the men's singles event at the 1988 Winter Olympics.

References

1975 births
Living people
North Korean male single skaters
Olympic figure skaters of North Korea
Figure skaters at the 1988 Winter Olympics
Place of birth missing (living people)